Amit Sebastian Paul (born 29 October 1983) is a Swedish businessman and retired singer. He was a member of the Swedish pop band A*Teens from 1998 to 2004, and briefly pursued a solo recording career after the band dissolved.

Biography
Paul was born in Boden, Sweden. His father was a Bengali Hindu and came to Sweden 10 years before Amit's birth, while his mother was originally from Värmland.

Career

A-Teens (1998–2004)
In 1998, Paul signed a record deal with Stockholm Records (part of Universal Music Group) along with his then bandmates Marie, Dhani and Sara. Together they performed as the A-Teens. In 1999, they released their first single, a cover of ABBA's Mamma Mia. The single topped the charts in Sweden for 8 consecutive weeks, and the success was similar around the world.

By 2000, the A-Teens' first album, The ABBA Generation had sold 4 million copies, and they became one of the most internationally successful Swedish pop bands.

After six years together and more than 5 million albums sold, the A-Teens disbanded following a Greatest Hits album and a final tour in Sweden.

Solo career
Amit has released his first Solo album "Songs In A Key Of Mine" which features 12 songs in April 2008, with the first single "Judge You" being released soon after.

Career in business
Amit Paul finished his Masters at the Stockholm School of Economics in 2009, and completed an internship at the management consultancy Bain & Company. In 2010 Amit joined his family business, Paxymer AB which specialises in flame retardants and product development within polymer chemistry. He is currently serving as Managing Director.

Personal life
Paul married Unnur Ýrr Helgadóttir, an Icelandic graphic designer in 2012. On December 31, 2015, she gave birth to their first child. The couple have two daughters, Lóa and Jari.

References

1983 births
Living people
Swedish pop singers
A-Teens members
20th-century Swedish male singers
21st-century Swedish male singers
English-language singers from Sweden
Swedish people of Bengali descent
Stockholm School of Economics alumni